Another Round ("binge drinking") is a 2020 black comedy-drama film directed by Thomas Vinterberg, from a screenplay by Vinterberg and Tobias Lindholm. An international co-production between Denmark, the Netherlands, and Sweden, the film stars Mads Mikkelsen, Thomas Bo Larsen, Magnus Millang, and Lars Ranthe.

The film had its world premiere at the Toronto International Film Festival on 12 September 2020, and was released in Denmark on 24 September 2020 by Nordisk Film. At the 93rd Academy Awards, the film won the Best International Feature Film and was also nominated for Best Director. It also won BAFTA Award for Best Film Not in the English Language and European Film Award for Best Film, and was nominated for the Golden Globe Award for Best Foreign Language Film.

Plot 
Teachers Martin, Tommy, Peter, and Nikolaj are colleagues and friends that work at a gymnasium school in Copenhagen. All four struggle with unmotivated students and feel that their lives have become boring and stale. At a dinner celebrating Nikolaj's 40th birthday, the group begins to discuss the theory of psychiatrist Finn Skårderud — that humans are born with a blood alcohol content (BAC) deficiency of 0.05%, and that being at 0.05% makes one more creative and relaxed. Martin is confronted by his senior students and their parents, who express that he has become a barrier to them passing their history exams.

The friends decide to embark on an experiment to test Skårderud's theory. They start a group log of what occurs when they start drinking at regular intervals to maintain this blood alcohol level. Two of the friends have personal challenges that also make this experiment attractive: Martin is depressed and alienated from his family and students, Nikolaj's wife seems to have contempt for him. Each man has his own way of sneaking alcohol during the day while teaching or coaching children, but they never drink and drive. They agree to a set of rules: their BAC should never be below 0.05 and they should not drink after 8:00pm or on the weekends.

Within a short period of time, all four members of the group find both their work and private lives more enjoyable and successful. Martin, in particular, is delighted as he finally manages to reconnect with his wife and children. His teaching of history becomes inspired, and his students begin enjoying class and respecting him. He teaches history through the lens of drinking alcohol, connecting with heavy drinking students. Agreeing that the experiment should be taken further, the group increases the daily BAC limit to 0.10. Still finding their lives improved, one night they decide to drink to oblivion to test the liberating effects, but after coming home incapacitated, both Martin and Nikolaj are confronted by their families. Martin's family express their worries, revealing that they knew he has been drinking for weeks. He and his wife express how each has drawn away from the other, and she admits to infidelity. The group abandons the experiment. Martin and his wife have split up, and while he tries to make amends, she rejects him.

All the members of the group have stopped drinking during the day with the exception of Tommy, who the others try to take care of. But at a faculty meeting where the headmaster reveals that teachers have been drinking at work, Tommy arrives incredibly drunk. Later, Tommy boards his boat drunk with his old dog, sails out on the ocean, and commits suicide by drowning at sea.

The three remaining members of the group go out to dinner after Tommy's funeral to celebrate him, and enjoy sparkling wine. While dining, Martin's wife texts him that she misses him a lot. The recently graduated students drive by, and Martin, Peter and Nikolaj join them in celebrating and drinking at the harbour. Martin, a former jazz ballet dancer, dances with the rest of the partygoers, which he had refused up to this point despite his colleagues' urging. His dance becomes increasingly energetic and joyous before jumping off the harbour.

Cast 
 Mads Mikkelsen as Martin
 Thomas Bo Larsen as Tommy
 Magnus Millang as Nikolaj
 Lars Ranthe as Peter
 Maria Bonnevie as Anika
 Helene Reingaard Neumann as Amalie
 Susse Wold as The Principal
 Magnus Sjørup as Jonas
 Silas Cornelius Van as Kasper
 Albert Rudbeck Lindhardt as Sebastian
 Martin Greis-Rosenthal as Overtjener
 Frederik Winther Rasmussen as Malthe
 Aksel Vedsegaard as Jason

Production 
The film was based on a play Vinterberg had written while working at Burgtheater, Vienna. Additional inspiration came from Vinterberg's own daughter, Ida, who had told stories of the drinking culture within the Danish youth. Ida had originally pressed Vinterberg to adapt the play into a movie, and she was slated to play the daughter of Martin (Mads Mikkelsen). The story was originally "A celebration of alcohol based on the thesis that world history would have been different without alcohol." However, four days into filming, Ida was killed in a car accident. Following the tragedy, the script was reworked to become more life-affirming. "It should not just be about drinking. It was about being awakened to life," stated Vinterberg. Tobias Lindholm served as director in the week following the accident. The film was dedicated to Ida, and was partially filmed in her classroom with her classmates.

During production, the four main actors and Vinterberg would meet to drink just enough to let go of embarrassment in front of each other. They would also watch drunk people on YouTube to better understand how completely inebriated people would act.

Release 
Another Round was set to have its world premiere at the 2020 Cannes Film Festival, prior to the festival's cancellation due to government restrictions prompted by the COVID-19 pandemic. The film instead had its world premiere at the Toronto International Film Festival. It also screened at the San Sebastián International Film Festival, where it competed for the Golden Shell and opened Film Fest Gent 2020 in Belgium.

It was released in Denmark on 24 September 2020, by Nordisk Film. In September 2020, Samuel Goldwyn Films acquired U.S. distribution rights to the film. It was also selected as opening film at the 51st International Film Festival of India.

Reception

Critical response 
The site's critics consensus states: "Take one part deftly directed tragicomedy, add a dash of Mads Mikkelsen in vintage form, and you've got Another Round — an intoxicating look at midlife crises." On Metacritic, the film has a weighted average score of 79 out of 100, based on 33 critics, indicating "generally favorable reviews".

Accolades

Remake 
An American English-language remake of the film is planned to star Leonardo DiCaprio and to be produced by Appian Way Productions, Endeavor Content, and Makeready.

See also 
 List of submissions to the 93rd Academy Awards for Best International Feature Film
 List of Danish submissions for the Academy Award for Best International Feature Film

References

External links 
 
 
 

2020 comedy-drama films
2020s high school films
2020 films
Best Danish Film Bodil Award winners
Best Danish Film Robert Award winners
Best Foreign Language Film Academy Award winners
Danish black comedy films
Danish comedy-drama films
2020s Danish-language films
Dutch black comedy films
Dutch comedy-drama films
European Film Awards winners (films)
Films about alcoholic drinks
Films about educators
Films directed by Thomas Vinterberg
Films with screenplays by Tobias Lindholm
Films set in Copenhagen
Films shot in Copenhagen
Films about alcoholism
Midlife crisis films
Samuel Goldwyn Films films
Swedish black comedy films
Swedish comedy-drama films